Providence is an unincorporated community in Cecil County, Maryland, United States. Hopewell and Little Elk Farm were listed on the National Register of Historic Places in 1979.

References

Unincorporated communities in Cecil County, Maryland
Unincorporated communities in Maryland